Gaja Vallivari Cheruvu is one of the ancient ponds in the history of Helapuri town (ancient name of Eluru city). During the Chalukyan period elephants used to drink water in this pond. Eluru is the former capital of the Vengi Dynasty. Between 11A.D.

Buddha statue

A magnificent 74 feet Buddha statue was constructed in the middle of the pond named Gajjalavari Cheruvu and a painting gallery was also created to spread the Buddha’s teachings. The pedestal is decorated with famous Amaravathi sculptures along the railings of the foot bridge up to the statue.
It was opened by Nallari Kiran Kumar Reddy who served as the Last Chief Minister of United Andhra Pradesh.

See also
 List of tallest statues
 List of statues

References

Tourist attractions in Eluru
Parks in Eluru
Indian Buddhist sculpture
Colossal Buddha statues
Buildings and structures in West Godavari district
State protected monuments in Andhra Pradesh
2013 sculptures
2013 establishments in Andhra Pradesh
Colossal statues in India